Calera y Chozas is a municipality located in the province of Toledo, Castile-La Mancha, Spain. According to the 2006 census (INE), the municipality has a population of 4157 inhabitants.

Villages
Calera y Chozas
Alberche del Caudillo, a village named after the Alberche River located 4 km away from the main town. It was established by the Instituto Nacional de Colonización in the General Franco era.

References

External links

Via Verde de La Jara

Municipalities in the Province of Toledo